Ossa (Bulgarian/Macedonian: Висока), known before 1926 as Visoka (Βυσσώκα), is a village and a community of the Lagkadas municipality. Before the 2011 local government reform it was part of the municipality of Vertiskos, of which it was a municipal district. The 2011 census recorded 387 inhabitants in the village and 456 inhabitants in the community of Ossa. The community of Ossa covers an area of 59.12 km2.

Ossa is traditionally a Slavic speaking village. The village's older name (Visoka) comes from the Slavic word meaning "high" or "elevated". In 1997, the Greek newspaper Eleftherotypia reported that authorities confiscated the icons of the local church in Ossa because they were inscribed in the Slavic alphabet.

Ossa is also the birthplace of Kyranna of Thessaloniki.

Administrative division
The community of Ossa consists of two separate settlements: 
Galini (population 69)
Ossa (population 387)
The aforementioned population figures are as of 2011.

Notable People born is Ossa
Ivan Angelov - 19th century Bulgarian Exarchate priest and leader of the Bulgarian community of Thessaloniki
Zapryan Stoyanov - Soldier in the Macedonian-Adrianopolitan Volunteer Corps

See also
 List of settlements in the Thessaloniki regional unit

References

Populated places in Thessaloniki (regional unit)